Herberts Cukurs (17 May 1900 – 23 February 1965) was a Latvian aviator and deputy commander of the Arajs Kommando, which carried out the largest mass murders of Latvian Jews in the Holocaust. Although Cukurs never stood trial, multiple Holocaust survivors' accounts, including the testimony of Zelma Shepshelovitz, credibly link him to war crimes and crimes against humanity. 

After being identified by a local Holocaust survivor in Brazil, who tried to alert authorities after seeing Cukurs' face on the cover a Brazilian magazine, Cukurs was investigated and ultimately assassinated in 1965 during capture by Nazi hunter operatives from the Israeli intelligence service Mossad.
One of the Mossad agents who killed Cukurs, "Künzle," and a journalist, Gad Shimron, authored a book on the experience, The Execution of the Hangman of Riga, in which they referred to Cukurs as "The Butcher of Latvia", which was later picked up by several other sources.

Biography

Aviation career (1930s–1941) 

As a pioneering long-distance pilot, Cukurs won national acclaim for his international solo flights in the 1930s (Latvia-Gambia and Riga-Tokyo). He was awarded the Harmon Trophy for Latvia in 1933, and was considered a national hero, in analogous fashion to Charles Lindbergh.

Cukurs built at least three aircraft of his own design. In 1937, he made a  tour visiting Japan, China, Indochina and India, flying the C 6 wooden monoplane "Trīs zvaigznes" (registration YL-ABA) of his own creation. The aircraft was powered by a De Havilland Gipsy engine.

Cukurs also designed the Cukurs C-6bis prototype dive bomber in 1940.

After the Soviet occupation of Latvia in 1940, Cukurs was summoned to Moscow in an attempt to recruit him to build planes for the Soviet Union.

Participation in the Arajs Kommando (1941–1944) 

In the summer of 1941, during the German occupation of Latvia, Cukurs became deputy commander of the newly formed Latvian Auxiliary Police unit, the Arajs Kommando.

In his book The Holocaust in Latvia, 1941-1945, Latvian historian Andrew Ezergailis writes that Cukurs played a leading role in the atrocities that were committed in the Riga ghetto in conjunction with the Rumbula massacre on 30 November 1941. After the war, surviving witnesses reported that Cukurs had been present during the ghetto clearance and fired into the mass of Jewish civilians.

According to other eyewitness sources, Cukurs was also the most recognizable Latvian SD man at the scene of the Rumbula massacre. Ezergailis states that "although Arājs' men were not the only ones on the ghetto end of the operation, to the degree they participated in the atrocities there, the chief responsibility rests on Herberts Cukurs' shoulders." Cukurs was described as follows:

Later, Ezergailis retracted these interpretations, saying that in light of new documents, it would be wrong to claim that Cukurs had participated in the Rumbula shooting or the burning of the Riga synagogues. During interviews with the press, Ezergailis stated that there is no evidence that Cukurs had been at the pits at Rumbula, and that it has not been proven that Cukurs was "the most eager shooter of Jews in Latvia".

However, according to eyewitness accounts, Cukurs had participated in the burning of the Riga synagogues and the killing of Jews that he had dragged out of their houses, locked inside the synagogue on Stabu Street, set it on fire and shot with his revolver anyone who broke the windows from inside and tried to get out of the burning building.

Time magazine reported at the time of Cukurs' death in 1965, his crimes included setting the Riga synagogue fire, executing over 1,200 Jewish civilians (including infants) forced to stand over a lake (so victims fell into the water) in just one of many massacres he carried out, kidnapping and raping Jewish girls and young women at the Arajs Kommando Headquarters, and his participation in the Rumbula massacre in a forest near Riga. Multiple eyewitnesses said they saw Cukurs snatching infants from the arms of their mothers and shooting them.

Postwar flight and assassination (1944–1965) 

Cukurs retreated to Germany with German forces and after the war fled to Brazil via the ratlines. The Brazilian Consulate in Marseille issued the visa for permanent residency on 18 December 1945. The visa did not list the name of the Latvian Jewish woman Cukurs kidnapped and pretended was his wife, but it identified three minor children: Gunārs, Antinea and Herberts. 

Once in Brazil, Cukurs established a business in São Paulo, flying Republic RC-3 Seabees on scenic flights. While living in South America, he neither hid nor tried to conceal his identity.

Cukurs was assassinated by Nazi hunting Mossad agents, who persuaded him to travel to Uruguay under the pretense of starting an aviation business, after it was learned that he would not stand trial for his participation in the Holocaust. An acquaintance named "Anton Künzle", in reality the disguised Mossad agent Yaakov Meidad who had taken part in the capture of Adolf Eichmann in Argentina in 1960, cabled Cukurs from Montevideo. He was invited to a house in a remote suburb of the city that had just been rented by a man from Vienna. Inside, he was ambushed by a group of men. 

Cukurs fought back aggresively against his attackers. At one point, Cukurs bit the finger of one of the hitmen so hard it was nearly severed. Ultimately, however, Cukurs was overwhelmed. He was subdued after one of the men hit him in the head with a hammer. Now helpless, Cukurs started pleading with the men to let him speak before they did anything else. He got no response, and was promptly shot in the head twice with a suppressed automatic pistol, killing him instantly. His body, found in a trunk on 6 March, had several gunshot wounds elsewhere, and his skull was shattered. Next to his body, several documents were left pertaining to his involvement in the murder of Jews in the Riga Ghetto.

Media outlets in South America and Germany received a note stating:

The note was initially dismissed as a prank, but then police were notified and the body was discovered.

One of the main motives of Cukurs's assassination was to deter West Germany from allowing the statute of limitations to expire on Nazi war crimes.

Legacy and controversy 
American-born Israeli historian and Nazi hunter Efraim Zuroff has pointed out that the fact that Cukurs was not prosecuted has allowed for what he believes are "attempts by right-wing nationalists and his family to totally exonerate Cukurs and by other Latvians to question or diminish his individual culpability" and "to restore him to hero status in Latvia and whitewash his massive guilt".

In 2004, postal envelopes with the image of Cukurs were issued and distributed by National Power Unity, a far-right nationalist political party in Latvia. The act was condemned by Yad Vashem, as well as Minister of Foreign Affairs of Latvia Artis Pabriks who said that "those who produced such envelopes in Latvia evidently do not understand the tragic history of World War II in Latvia or in Europe". The Ministry of Foreign Affairs stated that Cukurs was "guilty of war crimes", and that he "took part in the activities of the notorious Arajs Kommando, which participated in the Holocaust and was responsible for the killing of innocent civilians. The General Prosecutor's Office of Latvia has twice rejected the exoneration of Herberts Cukurs".

In summer of 2005, a controversial exhibition "Herberts Cukurs: The Presumption of Innocence" was organized by the culture and art NGO K@2 in Liepāja. In a letter, members of the Latvian Jewish community called the exhibit "an attempt to rehabilitate a war criminal," and criticized Latvian ultra-nationalist politician  for his tacit support of it. For his response, in which Kiršteins hinted at the Latvian Jewish community's collaboration with the "state's enemies" during Soviet occupation of Latvia in 1940, he was expelled from People's Party. After seeing the exhibit, director of the museum "Jews in Latvia" Marģers Vestermanis summarized its overall message as "Jews killed our hero."

Episode 1 of National Geographic's 2009 series Nazi Hunters recreated Mossad's assassination operation of Cukurs.

On 11 October 2014, a musical "Cukurs. Herberts Cukurs", produced by Juris Millers, premiered in Liepāja. "We are not Herbert Cukurs' advocates and we are not his judges," Millers said at the premiere, "I hope this performance will make you think." Another performance initially scheduled for 17 March, the day after the Remembrance day of the Latvian legionnaires, was postponed in fear of "serious provocations". The musical was criticised by Zuroff who tweeted he was "utterly disgusted" by it, Russian President Vladimir Putin called the musical a "vivid example" of open manifestations of neo-Nazism that he alleged had become "routine" in Latvia and other Baltic countries. Minister of Foreign Affairs of Latvia Edgars Rinkēvičs said the production “is not in good taste” and "cannot, in any way, be supported", but defended the producer's right to free speech.

In 2020, Stephan Talty published an account of the Mossad's hunt for Cukurs, titled The Good Assassin: How a Mossad Agent and a Band of Survivors Hunted Down the Butcher of Latvia.

Notes

References 
 Angrick, Angrej, and Klein, Peter, The "Final Solution" in Riga: Exploitation and Annihilation, 1941-1944, Berghahn Books, 2009 ; originally published as   Die „Endlösung“ in Riga., Darmstadt 2006, 
 Ezergailis, Andrew, The Holocaust in Latvia 1941-1944—The Missing Center, Historical Institute of Latvia (in association with the United States Holocaust Memorial Museum) Riga 1996 
 Goñi, Uki. The Real Odessa: Smuggling the Nazis to Perón's Argentina, Granta, New York 2002 
 Kaufmann, Max, Die Vernichtung des Judens Lettlands (The Destruction of the Jews of Latvia), Munich, 1947, English translation by Laimdota Mazzarins available on-line as Churbn Lettland -- The Destruction of the Jews of Latvia (all references in this article are to page numbers in the on-line edition)
 Künzle, Anton, Shimron, Gad, and Massad, Uriel, The Execution of the Hangman of Riga: The Only Execution of a Nazi War Criminal by the Mossad, Mitchell, Valentine & Co., 2004 
 Michelson, Max, City of Life, City of Death: Memories of Riga, University Press of Colorado (2001) 
 Press, Bernard, The Murder of the Jews in Latvia, Northwestern University Press, 2000

External links 

 Herbert Cukurs' flight to Gambia, 1933-1934 , historical information and images.
 Herbert Cukurs' flight to Tokyo, 1936-1937 , historical information and images.
 Herberts Cukurs and his airplanes in Brazil
 Collection of photos related to Herberts Cukurs
 Discovery Of Body Of Herbert Cukurs, Alleged Nazi War Criminal (1965). Archivo Reuters Uruguay.

1900 births
1965 deaths
1965 murders in Uruguay
Latvian military personnel of the Latvian War of Independence
Assassinated military personnel
Assassinated Latvian people
Assassinated Nazis
Military personnel from Liepāja
People from Courland Governorate
Latvian murder victims
People murdered in Uruguay
Deaths by firearm in Uruguay
Holocaust perpetrators in Latvia
Latvian aviators
Executed Soviet collaborators with Nazi Germany
Arajs Kommando personnel
Latvian expatriates in Uruguay
World War II pilots
Riga Ghetto
Nazis in South America
People killed in Mossad operations
Extrajudicial killings
Murderers of children
Nazis executed by firearm
Executed mass murderers